Chicago Catz is a Chicago, Illinois area cover band that was formed in 1986 by five noteworthy musicians.  Approaching their third decade, "The Catz", as they are affectionately known, have become one of the Windy City's most established professional R&B pop music bands. For more than 20 years, this group of notable professional musicians have performed at some of the most prestigious private parties and events in Chicago.

Band history
During the late 70's and early 80's there were three hugely successful local bands in Chicago: R&B group "Third Rail" (later known as "Maxx Traxx"), Ska band "Heavy Manners", and blues act "Big Twist & the Mellow Fellows". Each band sold out night clubs, played college concerts and put out albums of original music. By day, the musicians were respected studio/session players. Jingle houses and album producers were always putting out the call for "those cats from Chicago". The stress from the "let's make records" grind and the competition from session work was enormous. Several of the guys from the three groups were longtime friends and had similar musical tastes, namely Richard "Richie" Peter Davis, Anthony "Downtown Tony" Brown, Wayne Stewart, Brian Danzy (pianist/keyboardist for the world-renowned Staples Singers, Lou Rawls, Patti LaBelle, Anita Baker, Art Porter, Brian Culbertson, Rick Braun, Nick Colionne) and Johnny Britt currently the Temptations' touring music director. These musicians grew up listening to R&B pop music. They thought that it would be fun to put together a high energy R&B pop dance band as a side project. It would create a nice change of pace from their daily business pressures and give them the opportunity to play together. Through their contacts, they knew they could pick up some club dates and "let their hair down" playing songs made famous by the likes of Stevie Wonder, James Brown, Marvin Gaye and other greats of the Motown era.

The musicians got together after their sessions and rehearsed for several months until the music was tight. During this time, word got out that the new band had formed. At their first appearance, devoted fans of former bands that these musicians had previous membership in, such as "Third Rail", "Maxx Traxx", "Heavy Manners" and "Big Twist & The Mellow Fellows", attended in large numbers. This resulted in the new band's instant success. "The Catz" primarily perform now at wedding, corporate, private and special events. They still play occasional club dates.

Band members
The band currently comprises professional musicians Richard "Richie" Peter Davis on lead and rhythm guitar, Anthony "Downtown Tony" Brown on bass guitar and vocals, Wayne Stewart on drums and vocals, Kevin Smith (musician) on keyboards and vocals,  Mark Ohlsen on trumpet, Devin Thompson on vocals, Josie Aiello on lead and background vocals, James A. Perkins, Jr. on saxophone and woodwinds, Tony "Toca" Carpenter on percussion, and David Gross on trombone.

Appearances and Venues

Illinois
 Navy Pier Beer Garden (Chicago)

Outside of Illinois
Venues played outside of Illinois include:
 Capt'n Fun Beach Club (Pensacola Beach, Florida)

Festivals, Special Events, Corporate Functions
 Summer Dance 2010 weekday festivities at Jackson Park (Chicago) Beach Chicago, Illinois
 Summer Dance 2003 weekend festivities at Grant Park Chicago, Illinois
 Wedding receptions (only by special request)
 Annual McDonald's global convention /Orlando, Florida
 Annual McDonald's global convention /Atlantis Paradise Island-Nassau, Bahamas
 Annual McDonald's global convention /Cabo San Lucas, Mexico
 Annual McDonald's global convention /Boca Raton, Florida
 Tap National Sales Meeting/Las Vegas, Nevada
 Sheraton Hotels/San Diego, California
 Abbott Labs National Sales Meetings/Maui, Hawaii
 Abbott Labs National Sales Meetings/New Orleans, Louisiana
 Abbott Labs National Sales Meetings/Las Vegas, Nevada
 Quaker Oats Corporation
 Alltel National Sales Meeting/Little Rock, Arkansas
 Monsanto
 Wendy's National Sales Meeting/Chicago, Illinois
 BP Oil/Chicago, Illinois
 Sprint/Nextel
 Inner Circle
 Takeda
 Rotary International
 GE Healthcare

Media
The band has been featured live numerous times on Chicago television and have received air play on local radio. The band has also appeared in The Chicago Reader and Chicago Tribune newspapers.

The Chicago Catz are featured in the movie The Guardian (2006 film)  as well as performing on the soundtrack for the movie Holes (film).

Recordings
A DVD and long-awaited CD is currently in the works and the release dates have not yet been determined.

The Chicago Catz are featured on track number eleven of the Holes movie soundtrack album entitled: 11. Chicago Catz (Richard Davis) - "Happy Dayz"

Awards and achievements
In 1994, the Chicago Federation of Musicians presented its inaugural Living Art of Music Awards (LAMA) to deserving Chicago-based artist and groups. Nominees in the "Best Pop Group" category were Chicago, Richard Marx and the Chicago Catz.

References

External links
The Chicago Catz
Chicago Catz at MySpace
Chicago Catz at Facebook
(Official Chicago Catz at YouTube

Musical groups from Chicago